Ishita Sharma (born 8 February 1988) is an Indian actress, kathak dancer, entrepreneur and social activist. She began her acting career with theatre and television while still in school, with children's shows like Shaka Laka Boom Boom, and later went on to make her big screen debut in the 2007 English film Loins of Punjab Presents. Alongside working in films like Dil Dosti Etc and Dulha Mil Gaya, Ishita continued her kathak performances as well as further studies in psychology and literature and acquired a Master's degree in human development.

She later moved to television as Anjalika Solanki (Anji) in the series Kuch Toh Log Kahenge and co-anchored Dance India Dance (season 4) with Jay Bhanushali.

Ishita used her creative experiences to establish Aamad, her school for performing arts in 2014, and in 2016 launched the MukkaMaar initiative to empower the lesser-privileged girls with free self-defence. MukkaMaar was then formally registered as a non-profit in 2018 and continues to work with thousands of girls in India.

Filmography

Television

References

External links 

 

Living people
Indian film actresses
Actresses in Tamil cinema
Actresses in Hindi cinema
Actresses in Hindi television
Indian television actresses
21st-century Indian actresses
Kathak exponents
Actresses from Mumbai
1988 births